Janelle Amanda Loyola Avanzado (born June 1, 2003), better known by her stage name Jayda, is a Filipina singer, pianist and actress.

Career 
In December 2017, Jayda signed up with Cornerstone Entertainment.

In June 2018, Jayda released her debut EP, In My Room. On the same month, she also became a member of the teen pop group, ASAP G!, along with Darren Espanto, Ylona Garcia, Jeremy Glinoga, Kyle Echarri and Lala Vinzon.

In 2021, Jayda left Cornerstone Entertainment after three years and transferred to Rise Artists Studio. In that same year, she signed a contract with Star Magic. She would also stage her first major digital concert titled Jayda in Concert on June 26, 2021. She is set to make her acting debut in Teen Clash on March 17, 2023, where she will portray Zoe.

Filmography

Television

Awards and nominations

References 

Star Magic
2003 births
Living people